Metatheria is a mammalian clade that includes all mammals more closely related to marsupials than to placentals. First proposed by Thomas Henry Huxley in 1880, it is a more inclusive group than the marsupials; it contains all marsupials as well as many extinct non-marsupial relatives.

There are three extant subclasses of mammals, one being metatherians:
monotremes: egg laying mammals like the platypus and the echidna,
metatheria: marsupials, which includes three American orders (Didelphimorphia, Paucituberculata and Microbiotheria) and four Australasian orders (Notoryctemorphia, Dasyuromorphia, Peramelemorphia and Diprotodontia), and the
eutherians: placental mammals, consisting of four superorders divided into 21 orders.

Metatherians belong to a subgroup of the northern tribosphenic mammal clade or Boreosphenida. They differ from all other mammals in certain morphologies like their dental formula, which includes about five upper and four lower incisors, a canine, three premolars, and four molars. Other characters include skeletal and anterior dentition, such as wrist and ankle apomorphies; all metatherians share derived pedal characters and calcaneal features. The earliest known members of the group are from the latter half of the Early Cretaceous in North America. Remains of metatherians have been found on all continents.

Classification
Below is a metatherian cladogram from Wilson et al. (2016):

Below is a listing of metatherians that do not fall readily into well-defined groups.

Basal Metatheria
†Archaeonothos henkgodthelpi Beck 2015
†Esteslestes ensis Novacek et al. 1991
†Ghamidtherium dimaiensis Sánches-Villagra et al. 2007
†Kasserinotherium tunisiense Crochet 1989
†Palangania brandmayri Goin et al. 1998
†Perrodelphys coquinense Goin et al. 1999

Ameridelphia incertae sedis:
†Apistodon exiguus (Fox 1971) Davis 2007
†Cocatherium lefipanum Goin et al. 2006
†Dakotadens morrowi Eaton 1993
†Iugomortiferum thoringtoni Cifelli 1990b
†Marambiotherium glacialis Goin et al. 1999
†Marmosopsis juradoi Paula Couto 1962 [Marmosopsini Kirsch & Palma 1995]
†Pascualdelphys fierroensis
†Progarzonia notostylopense Ameghino 1904
†Protalphadon Cifelli 1990
†P. lulli (Clemens 1966) Cifelli 1990a
†P. foxi Johnson 1996

Marsupialia incertae sedis:
†Itaboraidelphys camposi Marshall & de Muizon 1984
†Mizquedelphys pilpinensis Marshall & de Muizon 1988
†Numbigilga ernielundeliusi Beck et al. 2008 {Numbigilgidae Beck et al. 2008}

Evolutionary history
The relationships between the three extant divisions of mammals (monotremes, marsupials, and placental mammals) was long a matter of debate among taxonomists. Most morphological evidence comparing traits, such as the number and arrangement of teeth and the structure of the reproductive and waste elimination systems, favors a closer evolutionary relationship between marsupials and placental mammals than either has with the monotremes, as does most genetic and molecular evidence.

Fossil metatherians are distinguished from eutherians by the form of their teeth: metatherians possess four pairs of molar teeth in each jaw, whereas eutherian mammals (including true placentals) never have more than three pairs. Using this criterion, the earliest known metatherian was formerly considered to be Sinodelphys szalayi, which lived in China around 125 million years ago (mya). This makes it a contemporary to some early eutherian species that have been found in the same area. However, Bi et al. (2018) reinterpreted Sinodelphys as an early member of Eutheria. The oldest uncontested metatherians are now 110 million year old fossils from western North America. Metatherians were widespread in Asia and North America during the Late Cretaceous, including both Deltatheroida and Marsupialiformes. Metatherians underwent a severe decline during the K-Pg extinction event, more severe than that suffered by contemporary eutherians and multituberculates, and were slower to recover diversity.

Morphological and species diversity of metatherians in Laurasia remained low in comparison to eutherians throughout the Cenozoic. The two major groups of Cenozoic Laurasian metatherians, the opossum-like herpetotheriids and peradectids persisted into the Miocene before becoming extinct, with the North American herpetotheriid Herpetotherium, the European herpetotheriid Amphiperatherium and the peradectids Siamoperadectes and Sinoperadectes from Asia being the youngest Laurasian metatherians. Metatherians first arrived in Afro-Arabia during the Paleogene, probably from Europe, including the possible peradectoid Kasserinotherium from the Early Eocene of Tunisia and the herpetotheriid Peratherium africanum from the Early Oligocene of Egypt and Oman. The youngest African metatherian is the possible herpetotheriid Morotodon from the late Early Miocene of Uganda.

Metatherians arrived in South America from North America during the Paleocene and underwent a major diversificiation, with South American metatherians including both the ancestors of extant marsupials as well as the extinct Sparassodonta, which were major predators in South American ecosystems during most of the Cenozoic, up until their extinction in the Pliocene, as well as the Polydolopimorphia, which likely had a wide range of diets. The oldest known Australian marsupials are from the early Eocene, and are thought to have arrived in the region after having dispersed from Antarctica. The only known Antarctic metatherians are from the Early Eocene La Meseta Formation of the Antarctic Peninsula, where they are the most diverse group of mammals, and include marsupials as well as polydolopimorphians.

References

 
Marsupials of Central America
Marsupials of South America
Mammals of North America
Early Cretaceous mammals
Cretaceous mammals
Paleogene mammals
Neogene mammals
Quaternary mammals
Prehistoric marsupials
Extant Early Cretaceous first appearances
Mammal unranked clades